Rue Gît-le-Cœur is a street in the 6th arrondissement of Paris, France.

Name

In the 14th century the street was documented under the name Gilles-Queux or Gui-le-Queux, presumably referring to a cook ( in Old French) named Giles. Later names include Gui-le-Preux, Villequeux, Gui-le-Comte, and Gilles-le-Cœur. It was also known at various points as rue des Noyers (1423), rue des Deux-Moutons, and rue du Battoir (1639).

History

The street was opened around 1200 on former vineyards of Saint-Germain-des-Prés Abbey.

In the second quarter of the 16th century it was acquired and rebuilt by King Francis I for his chief mistress Anne de Pisseleu d'Heilly, who stayed there until her exile following Francis's death in 1547.

In 1641 Louis Charles d'Albert de Luynes married Louise Marie Séguier, Marquise d'O, and the property became known as the  until its partitioning in 1671. Parts of the 1671 rebuilding are preserved in the courtyard of No.5.

It was later used by Paris Bishop ; by Thomas Montagu, 4th Earl of Salisbury, in 1422; by Louis II de Luxembourg, Bishop of Thérouanne, in 1428; and was eventually partitioned in 1535.

Most of the street's current buildings date from the late 16th to late 18th centuries. The whole street was inundated during the 1910 Great Flood of Paris.

From the 18th to late 20th centuries, the street was a hub of the Parisian bookstore business. A bookshop affiliated with the Maoist Union des jeunesses communistes marxistes-léninistes operated at No.6 from 1967 to 1978, bankrolled by the wealthy grandmother of activist , and gave its name to the short-lived far-left publishing house .

At No.6, a fencing club opened in 1886 and still operates as of 2022, claiming to be the oldest remaining in Paris. École César Franck, a private music school, operated at No.8 from 1968 until its closure in the 1980s.

As of 2021, the tiny street's commercial activity is mainly related to tourism, with several hotels and restaurants.

Notable individuals

 Royal official Nicolas René Berryer owned No.7 in the 18th century.
 Bibliographer Jacques-Charles Brunet lived at No.4 and wrote there his book , published in 1810.
 Kléber Bénard, a member of the criminal Bonnot Gang, lived at No.17 in 1911.
 Czech writer Vítězslav Nezval gave the street's name to a book (1936) based on his stay in Paris for the International Writers' Congress for the Defense of Culture in June 1935, in memory of the street's restaurant where he spent time with André Breton, Paul Éluard and Benjamin Péret.
 Indian yoga guru Meher Baba lived at No.1 during a Parisian stay in 1936.
 French Caribbean writer Édouard Glissant was a regular at his friend Maurice Roche's room at No.7, in the early 1950s.
 French graphic artist Raymond Savignac lived at No.10 in the 1950s.
 From 1957 to 1963 several poets and artists of the Beat Generation stayed in a rundown pension at No.9 which they nicknamed the Beat Hotel, including Sinclair Beiles, William S. Burroughs, Gregory Corso, Allen Ginsberg, Brion Gysin, Harold Norse, Peter Orlovsky, Derek Raymond, and Ian Sommerville.
 Israeli painter Hanna Ben Dov lived at No.12 in the 1960s and 1970s.
 French author  ran the bookshop at No.6 before turning away from Maoism in 1971.

In art

Gallery

See also
 Rue des Grands-Augustins

Notes

Access

Gît-le-Cœur